Las Cruces Sun-News, founded in 1881, is a daily newspaper published in Las Cruces, New Mexico.

History

The Sun-News started in 1881 as the Rio Grande Republican and went through several mergers to become the Las Cruces Daily News in 1934. Another daily, the Las Cruces Sun, started publication in 1937 and bought the Daily News in 1939 to form the Las Cruces Sun-News. The paper changed ownership several times, bought by Opal Lee Priestley and Orville Priestley, in 1946; then sold to Worrell Newspapers Inc., in 1970, and acquired by Garden State, a subsidiary of MediaNews Group in 1989, it was most recently bought by Gannett. The paper became part of the Texas-New Mexico Newspapers Partnership, a joint venture formed in 2003 between MediaNews Group and Gannett, with MediaNews Group the managing partner.
 In 2015, Gannett acquired full ownership of the Texas-New Mexico Newspapers Partnership.

References

External links 

 Las Cruces Sun-News website
 Official mobile website

Newspapers published in New Mexico
Publications established in 1881
Gannett publications
Mass media in Las Cruces, New Mexico
1881 establishments in New Mexico Territory